Stuart Allan Lewis (born 15 October 1987) is an English retired footballer who works as Under-18s coach for Tottenham Hotspur.

Early life
Born in Welwyn Garden City, Lewis has lived in Turnford, Hertfordshire since birth. He played youth football for Wormley youth U8-U10s. While playing U10s he captained the league representative team, winning the interleague cup.

Career

Youth career
Lewis joined for Norwich City Academy in 1995, and moved to the Arsenal Academy in 1998. During his time at Arsenal he captained the U10s to U16s also representing the England Youth team. He played six games for the U16s squad, winning the Victory Shield in 2002 and captaining the team in 2003 on tour to Northern Ireland. Furthermore, he played twice for the England U17s. He joined the Tottenham Hotspur youth system in 2004 on a scholarship contract.

In 2005, he signed a two-year professional contract. After signing his contract Lewis went on to regularly captain the Tottenham U18s youth team. Notably playing in the FA Youth Cup semi-final team, whilst playing alongside players who were a year older.

He progressed to the Tottenham reserve team, where he played regularly. In 2006, won the Premier Reserve League South.

Move to Barnet
Lewis wanted to play first team football. In 2007, he left Tottenham to join Barnet on 31 January 2007, where he made his Bees debut against Torquay United on 3 February.
On 22 March, he was released by Barnet and he subsequently signed for Stevenage Borough.

Stevenage
In the same year (2007) he signed for Stevenage Borough. Whilst playing here, he starred in the England C team against Finland U'21s, winning 2–0 in Helsinki.

Gillingham
Lewis signed for Gillingham on 28 January 2008, alongside Barry Fuller, both men linking up again with former Stevenage manager Mark Stimson. He made his debut for Gillingham in the 2–0 away defeat to Tranmere Rovers on 29 January 2008. Lewis played for Gillingham in the 2009 Football League Two play-off Final at the new Wembley Stadium, gaining promotion to League One after beating Shrewsbury Town 1–0.

Dagenham & Redbridge
He joined newly promoted League One side Dagenham & Redbridge on a three-year contract in June 2010.

Wycombe Wanderers
After making 10 appearances for the "Daggers", on 22 November, he was sent on a one-month loan to Wycombe Wanderers. The deal was extended by a further month on 21 December, and the following month Lewis' contract with Dagenham was cancelled by mutual consent and he joined Wycombe on an 18-month contract. After signing a permanent deal for Wycombe in January 2011 Lewis went on to be an integral part of the team which gained automatic promotion to league one in 2011.

Wycombe were relegated to League Two in 2012. Lewis remained at the club, making over 150 first-team appearances and being named Players' Player of the Season and Wycombe Wanderers supporters association Player of the Year in 2012–13. Wanderers manager Gareth Ainsworth appointed
Lewis as club captain in 2013.

Ebbsfleet United
In January 2015 Lewis dropped into non-League football when he joined Conference South club Ebbsfleet United. Manager Jamie Day made Lewis club captain in 2015. Lewis was voted Ebbsfleet player of the year for 2015–16.

Maidstone United
On 19 January 2017 Lewis joined National League club Maidstone United on loan until the end of the season. He made his debut against Torquay United on 21 January, with his performance in the 2–1 victory winning him the man-of-the-match award. On 29 April it was announced that Lewis had made his move permanent. Lewis was named Maidstone United's Supporters Player of the Year 2016–17, he was also named in the Kent Online Team of the Season 2016–17. In January 2018 manager Jay Saunders named Lewis as captain.

Dover Athletic
On 11 October 2018, following a transfer request, Lewis left Maidstone to join fellow league rivals, Dover Athletic on a two-year deal. He made 31 league appearances in the 2018–19 season, scoring two goals.

Coaching career
Having had a part-time role there for four years, Lewis took up a full-time coaching role at the Tottenham Hotspur academy in 2019, and thereupon retired from playing football. In July 2021, Lewis was appointed manager of Spurs Under-18s.

Career statistics

References

External links

Stuart Lewis player profile at gillinghamfootballclub.com

1987 births
Living people
Sportspeople from Welwyn Garden City
English footballers
England youth international footballers
England semi-pro international footballers
Association football midfielders
Norwich City F.C. players
Arsenal F.C. players
Tottenham Hotspur F.C. players
Barnet F.C. players
Stevenage F.C. players
Gillingham F.C. players
Dagenham & Redbridge F.C. players
Wycombe Wanderers F.C. players
Ebbsfleet United F.C. players
Maidstone United F.C. players
Dover Athletic F.C. players
English Football League players
National League (English football) players
People from the Borough of Broxbourne
Tottenham Hotspur F.C. non-playing staff